Directive 51 could refer to:
 Directive 51 (novel) by John Barnes
 George W. Bush's National Security and Homeland Security Presidential Directive 51
 Adolf Hitler's Directive 51 (3 November 1943) concerning the Atlantic Wall.
 51st Directive (novel) 51st Directive  (novel) by Michael Agliolo